The 2022 Challenger Rio de Janeiro was a professional tennis tournament played on clay courts. It was the first edition of the tournament which was part of the 2022 ATP Challenger Tour. It took place in Rio de Janeiro, Brazil between 10 and 16 October 2022.

Singles main draw entrants

Seeds

 1 Rankings are as of 3 October 2022.

Other entrants
The following players received wildcards into the singles main draw:
  Gustavo Almeida
  João Fonseca
  João Lucas Reis da Silva

The following player received entry into the singles main draw as a special exempt:
  Jan Choinski

The following players received entry into the singles main draw as alternates:
  Genaro Alberto Olivieri
  Juan Bautista Torres
  Gonzalo Villanueva

The following players received entry from the qualifying draw:
  Rémy Bertola
  Giovanni Mpetshi Perricard
  Sumit Nagal
  Mariano Navone
  Jakub Paul
  Juan Pablo Paz

Champions

Singles

  Marco Cecchinato def.  Yannick Hanfmann 4–6, 6–4, 6–3.

Doubles

  Guido Andreozzi /  Guillermo Durán def.  Karol Drzewiecki /  Jakub Paul 6–3, 6–2.

References

Challenger Rio de Janeiro
2022 in Brazilian tennis
October 2022 sports events in Brazil